The Ande railway station is a railway station on the Chengdu–Dujiangyan Intercity Railway in Pidu District, Chengdu, Sichuan, China. This station has been fully built but no trains currently stop at Ande.

See also
Chengdu–Dujiangyan Intercity Railway

References

Stations on the Chengdu–Dujiangyan Intercity Railway
Railway stations in Sichuan
Railway stations in China opened in 2010